Trackdown is an American Western television series starring Robert Culp that aired  on CBS between 1957 and 1959. The series was produced by Dick Powell's Four Star Television and filmed at the Desilu-Culver Studio. Trackdown was a spin-off of Powell's anthology series, Dick Powell's Zane Grey Theatre.

Overview
Trackdown stars Robert Culp as Texas Ranger Hoby Gilman. It is set in the 1870s after the American Civil War.  In early episodes, stories focused on Gilman going to different Texas towns in pursuit of wanted fugitives. At midseason, the series became set in the town of Porter, Texas. Episodes touched on multiple Western themes and topics, so it was known as "the thinking man's Western".

Gilman is the de facto sheriff in Porter. His friends in the town include Henrietta Porter, portrayed by Ellen Corby (who later played Esther Walton on CBS's The Waltons). She is the widow of the town's founder and owns The Porter Enterprise newspaper. Occasionally, his duties as a Texas Ranger took him out of town, where he used his fast gun to "track down" and apprehend wanted criminals throughout the Lone Star State.

The pilot episode, "Badge of Honor", directed by Arthur Hiller, aired on Zane Grey Theatre on May 3, 1957. Gilman, then an ex-Confederate cavalry officer, returns to his Central Texas hometown called "Crawford" after the war. He finds the town under the  control of a ruthless gang led by an ex-Confederate colonel, Boyd Nelson, played by Gary Merrill. The town sheriff, portrayed by The Lineup star Tom Tully, is a drunken shell of the man whom Gilman had once known, who is afraid to face the outlaws. When a Texas Ranger came to arrest Colonel Nelson, he is fatally shot in the back. His Ranger badge falls on the dusty road. Gilman, who previously served with the Texas Rangers, was weary of the Civil War and did not want to continue as a lawman, but after learning of the Ranger's death, he picked up the badge and finished the job of bringing Nelson and his gang to justice.

Trackdown carried the endorsement of both the State of Texas and the Texas Rangers, an accolade no other Western television series has received. Some episodes were inspired by the files of the Rangers.

Episodes

Season 1: 1957–58

Season 2: 1958–59

Background and production

Development
All Trackdown episodes were produced by Vincent Fennelly. John Robinson wrote 14 segments, including the pilot. Richard Donner was one of the directors. Sam Peckinpah wrote one episode, "The Town", about a cowardly community afraid to resist the clutches of an outlaw gang, but he did not direct any Trackdown episodes. Robert Culp wrote one episode titled "Back to Crawford", which featured his then-wife, Nancy Asch-Culp. This episode was directly related to the first regular-series episode, "The Marple Brothers", as Nancy portrayed a former childhood friend of Hoby's, Merrilee Quintana, with whom Hoby was once in love, who was out to kill his sister Norah as revenge for his killing her young husband in the line of duty, who was one of the evil Marple Brothers whom he encountered in episode one. His sister was played by actress Peggy Webber, reprising her role from the series pilot. She went on to guest-star in "Child Out of Time", an episode of Culp's series I Spy a few years later. 

In an interview, Robert Culp stated that Trackdown was conceived by its creators as "the Western Dragnet". The pilot of the series was written by John Robinson, who according to Culp in that same interview, was partly responsible for the creation of Dragnet.

The series narrator was character actor Ed Prentiss.

Guest stars

Nick Adams
Chris Alcaide
Fred Aldrich
John Anderson
Robert Armstrong
Phyllis Avery
Trevor Bardette
Claudia Barrett
James Best
Paul Birch
Whit Bissell
George Brenlin
Paul Brinegar
Walter Brooke
Edgar Buchanan
King Calder
Ahna Capri
Sidney Clute
James Coburn
Russ Conway
Walter Coy
Johnny Crawford
Dennis Cross
Richard Devon
James Drury
Don Durant
Scott Forbes
Robert Foulk
Beverly Garland
Dabbs Greer
Richard Hale
Rodolfo Hoyos Jr.
Richard Jaeckel
Vivi Janiss
Robert Karnes
DeForest Kelley
Jess Kirkpatrick
Michael Landon
Nolan Leary
Forrest Lewis
Strother Martin
Carole Mathews
Ken Mayer
Steve McQueen
Joseph Mell
Rita Moreno
Neyle Morrow
Vic Morrow
James Murdock
James Nolan
Warren Oates
Susan Oliver
James Parnell
Joseph V. Perry
Richard Reeves
Paul Richards
Pernell Roberts
Gloria Saunders
Karen Sharpe
Harold J. Stone
Ray Teal
William Talman
Russell Thorson
Lee Van Cleef
Stuart Whitman
Jean Willes
Chill Wills

Release

Syndication
From 2016 to 2020, episodes of Trackdown then aired Saturday mornings on MeTV.

Cultural references
"The End of the World" episode received considerable media attention after Donald Trump was elected president of the United States in 2016, nearly 60 years after the episode first aired. In the episode, a rabble-rousing doomsayer named Walter Trump (played by Lawrence Dobkin) comes to town. He scares the townsfolk with talk of an impending disaster and claims to be the only person who can save them – by building a wall. He also threatens to sue Hoby when accused of dishonesty. By the end of the episode, he is arrested as a conman and fraud. The coincidental similarity to Donald Trump's name and proposed border wall was noted.

A Vanity Fair author wrote, "of all the books and movies that presaged the rise of our reality-TV President... none are so eerily on the nose as this once-obscure, 1958 episode of Trackdown in which a demagogue named Trump attempts to convince a town that only he can save its citizens... by building a wall." The Wrap asked, "Want to talk about a weird coincidence?.... Some may call this episode titled 'The End of the World' the ultimate illustration of life imitating art, considering the episode aired May 9, 1958... it is pretty amusing, especially when the TV character threatens, 'Be careful, son. I can sue you.'" The San Francisco Chronicle stated, "the character's speech is so similar to the President-elect's, it almost seems as if Donald Trump borrowed some catchphrases from Walter Trump."

References

External links

 

1950s Western (genre) television series
1957 American television series debuts
1959 American television series endings
Television series set in the 1870s
Black-and-white American television shows
CBS original programming
English-language television shows
Fictional characters of the Texas Ranger Division
Television series about the Texas Ranger Division
Television series by CBS Studios
Television series by Four Star Television
Television shows set in Texas